Platysoma is a genus of clown beetles in the family Histeridae. There are at least 60 described species in Platysoma.

Species
 Platysoma abyssinicum Lewis, 1885
 Platysoma aequum (J. L. LeConte, 1863)
 Platysoma afghanum (Kryzhanovskij, 1980)
 Platysoma anceps (Schmidt, 1892)
 Platysoma angustatum (Hoffmann, 1803)
 Platysoma asiatica Lewis, 1892
 Platysoma attenuatum J. E. LeConte, 1844
 Platysoma aurelianum (Horn, 1873)
 Platysoma aureoliferum Marseul, 1864
 Platysoma baliolum Lewis, 1889
 Platysoma basale J. L. LeConte, 1862
 Platysoma beybienkoi Kryzhanovskij, 1972
 Platysoma bifoveolatum (Bousquet and Laplante, 1999)
 Platysoma bimaculatum Mazur, 1990
 Platysoma brahmani Lewis, 1910
 Platysoma chinense Lewis, 1894
 Platysoma clarenciae Marseul, 1870
 Platysoma coarctatum J. E. LeConte, 1844
 Platysoma compressum (Herbst, 1783)
 Platysoma conditum Marseul, 1864
 Platysoma coomani Thérond, 1955
 Platysoma cornix Marseul, 1861
 Platysoma cylindricum (Paykull, 1811)
 Platysoma debile Marseul, 1864
 Platysoma deficiens (Casey, 1924)
 Platysoma deplanatum (Gyllenhal, 1808)
 Platysoma directum Lewis, 1885
 Platysoma dufali Marseul, 1864
 Platysoma elongatum (Thunberg, 1787)
 Platysoma feles Marseul, 1864
 Platysoma filiforme Erichson, 1834
 Platysoma gemellum (Cooman, 1929)
 Platysoma germanum Lewis, 1907
 Platysoma gracile J. E. LeConte, 1845
 Platysoma ineditum (Desbordes, 1925)
 Platysoma inexpectatum Lackner, 2004
 Platysoma joliveti Gomy, 2007
 Platysoma koreanum Mazur, 1999
 Platysoma leconti Marseul, 1853
 Platysoma lineare Erichson, 1834
 Platysoma lineicolle Marseul, 1873
 Platysoma loriae Schmidt, 1893
 Platysoma malignum Cooman, 1941
 Platysoma minax Mazur, 1999
 Platysoma moluccanum Marseul, 1864
 Platysoma multistriatum Lea, 1925
 Platysoma novum Lewis, 1885
 Platysoma orientale (Lewis, 1892)
 Platysoma parallelum (Say, 1825)
 Platysoma paugami (Le Guillou, 1844)
 Platysoma punctigerum (J. L. LeConte, 1862)
 Platysoma raffrayi Desbordes, 1929
 Platysoma rasile Lewis, 1884
 Platysoma rimarium Erichson, 1834
 Platysoma rufopygum Lewis, 1905
 Platysoma ruptistriatum Lewis, 1904
 Platysoma sichuanum Mazur, 2007
 Platysoma striatipectum Marseul, 1870
 Platysoma striatisternum Lewis, 1892
 Platysoma striativarium Lea, 1925
 Platysoma striativentre Lea, 1925
 Platysoma subcostatum Lea, 1925
 Platysoma subdepressum MacLeay, 1871
 Platysoma suturistrium Marseul, 1879
 Platysoma takehikoi Ôhara, 1986
 Platysoma torpens Marseul, 1864
 Platysoma tsushimae Ôhara, 1986
 Platysoma vulsum Bickhardt, 1920
 Platysoma yunnanum (Kryzhanovskij, 1972)

References

 Mazur, Slawomir (1997). "A world catalogue of the Histeridae (Coleoptera: Histeroidea)". Genus, International Journal of Invertebrate Taxonomy (Supplement), 373.
 Ôhara, Masahiro, and Slawomir Mazur (2002). "A revision of the genera of the tribe Platysomatini (Coleoptera, Histeridae, Histerinae). Part 4: Redescriptions of the type species of Heudister, Platysoma, Cylister, Cylistus, Nicotikis, Mesostrix and Desbordesia". Insecta Matsumurana (N.S.), vol. 59, 1-28.

Further reading

 Arnett, R. H. Jr., M. C. Thomas, P. E. Skelley and J. H. Frank. (eds.). (21 June 2002). American Beetles, Volume II: Polyphaga: Scarabaeoidea through Curculionoidea. CRC Press LLC, Boca Raton, Florida .
 Arnett, Ross H. (2000). American Insects: A Handbook of the Insects of America North of Mexico. CRC Press.
 Richard E. White. (1983). Peterson Field Guides: Beetles. Houghton Mifflin Company.

Histeridae